Elma is a river of Poland, a tributary of the Łyna River near Lidzbark Warmiński.

Rivers of Poland
Rivers of Warmian-Masurian Voivodeship